This is a list of  lighthouses in Bonaire.

Lighthouses

See also
 Lists of lighthouses and lightvessels

References

External links
 

Bonaire
Lighthouses